Menathais viciani is an extinct species of sea snail, a marine gastropod mollusk, in the family Muricidae, the murex snails or rock snails.

Distribution
This species occurs in Middle Miocene deposits at Letkés, Hungary. It is the first fossil representative of genus Menathais.

References

viciani
Gastropods described in 2018
Miocene gastropods